The 1977–78 Quebec Nordiques season was the Nordiques sixth season in the WHA, as they were coming off of a 47–31–3 record in the 1976–77 season, finishing in first place in the Eastern Division.  Quebec defeated the New England Whalers, Indianapolis Racers and Winnipeg Jets to win their first ever Avco Cup.

Off-season
During the off-season, the league would lose another three teams, as the Calgary Cowboys, Phoenix Roadrunners, and San Diego Mariners would all fold, bringing the league down to eight teams.  The WHA abandoned the divisional format and grouped the remaining teams together.  There had been a tentative agreement that would see the Nordiques, Cincinnati Stingers, Edmonton Oilers, Houston Aeros, New England Whalers, and Winnipeg Jets join the National Hockey League, however, it could not be finalized.  In a unique move, the Soviet All-Stars and Czechoslovakian All-Stars would play games that would count in the final standings, as they played each WHA team once.

Regular season
After losing their opening two games, the Nordiques would get hot, and earn a 16–10–1 record through their opening 27 games to sit in second place in the league.  Quebec would then fall into a slump, in which they would post a record of 11–20–1 record in their next 32 games to fall three games under .500, and into fifth place.  The slump would cost head coach Marc Boileau his job, as he was relieved of his duties and replaced with Maurice Filion.  Under Filion, the Nordiques improved, earning a record of 13–7–1 to finish the season with a 40–37–3 record, earning 83 points, and fourth place in the league.

Offensively, Quebec was led by Marc Tardif, who won the Bill Hunter Trophy awarded to the player who leads the league in scoring.  Tardif led the league in goals with 65, tied for the league lead with 89 assists, for 154 points.  Real Cloutier had another great season, scoring 56 goals and 129 points in 73 games.  Serge Bernier finished third in team scoring with 78 points, despite missing 24 games, while Paulin Bordeleau scored 42 goals and 65 points.  On defense, Garry Lariviere had a breakout season, earning 56 points, while Jean Bernier had 10 goals and 42 points.  J.C. Tremblay continued to put up points, earning 42 in 56 games and Paul Baxter had 35 points, along with a team high 240 penalty minutes.

In goal, Richard Brodeur missed some time due to injuries, however, he still led the team with 18 wins and a 3.70 GAA in 36 games.  Backup Jim Corsi had 10 wins and a 4.52 GAA, while Ken Broderick earned 9 wins with a 4.37 GAA.

Season standings

Schedule and results

Playoffs
In the opening round of the playoffs, Quebec would face the Houston Aeros in a best of seven series.  The Aeros finished the season with a 42–34–4 record, earning 86 points, and a third-place finish.  The series opened in Houston, and the Aeros won the series opener in overtime by a 4–3 score, however, the defending champion Nordiques evened the series with a 5–4 overtime victory in the second game.  The series moved to Quebec for the next two games, and the Nordiques took control of the series, winning the third game 5–1, followed by a 3–0 shutout victory in the fourth game to take a 3–1 series lead.  The fifth game was played in Houston, and the Aeros staved off elimination with a 5–2, bringing the series back to Quebec for the sixth game.  The Nordiques would dominate in the sixth game, crushing the Aeros 11–2, and advance to the WHA semi-finals.

In the WHA semi-finals, the Nordiques would face off against the New England Whalers.  New England finished in second during the regular season, with a record of 44–31–5, earning 93 points.  The Whalers defeated the Edmonton Oilers in five games in the opening round of the playoffs.  The series opened with two games in New England, and the Whalers took an early series lead with a 5–1 victory in the series opener.  Quebec fought back and tied the series up with a 3–2 win in the second game.  The series moved to Quebec for the next two games, however, it was the Whalers who took control of the series, defeating the Nordiques 5–4 in the third game, followed by a 7–3 win in the fourth game to take a 3–1 series lead.  In the fifth game back in New England, the Whalers took their opportunity and finished off the Nordiques, defeating Quebec 6–3 to win the series.

Quebec Nordiques 4, Houston Aeros 2

New England Whalers 4, Quebec Nordiques 1

Player statistics

Scoring leaders

Goaltending

Awards & records

Draft picks
Quebec's draft picks at the 1977 WHA Amateur Draft.

Farm teams

See also
1977–78 WHA season

References

SHRP Sports
The Internet Hockey Database

Quebec Nordiques seasons
Que
Quebec